Anigandlapadu is a village in Krishna district of the Indian state of Andhra Pradesh. It is located in Penuganchiprolu mandal of Vijayawada revenue division.

Geography 
It has an average elevation of 42 metres (141 feet).

See also 
List of villages in Krishna district

References 

Villages in Krishna district